Who Is The Man? (1924) is a British silent film drama directed by Walter Summers.  The film was based on the successful French play Daniel by Louis Verneuil and is notable as the first screen appearance of John Gielgud.

Plot
Daniel Arnault (Gielgud), an impecunious sculptor, is in love with the beautiful Genevieve (Isobel Elsom).  Spurred on by her mercenary and socially ambitious mother however, Genevieve consents to marry Daniel's wealthy brother Albert (Langhorn Burton).  In despair, Daniel sinks into drug addiction.

The marriage is not a success, and Genevieve feels ignored and neglected by Albert.  She begins a flirtation with family friend Maurice Granger (Lewis Drayton) and the pair gradually fall in love.  One day Genevieve decides to pay a call on Daniel, and by chance meets Maurice who is also visiting.

Unknown to Genevieve, Albert has become suspicious of her and has followed her to Daniel's studio.  He shows up in a fury, and Daniel manages to hide Genevieve and Maurice.  Knowing that Genevieve has been there, Albert accuses his brother of being her lover and attacks him brutally.  Daniel fails to recover from the assault, and as he is dying he begs his brother to give Genevieve her freedom and allow her to go off with Maurice

Cast
 John Gielgud as Daniel Arnault
 Isobel Elsom as Genevieve Arnault
 Langhorn Burton as Albert Arnault
 Lewis Dayton as Maurice Granger
 Henry Vibart as Doctor
 Hugh Dempster as Robert Borden
 Mary Rorke as Mrs. Gerard

Reception
Surviving reviews suggest that Who Is the Man? received a mixed reception from critics.  While the standard of acting and the film's visuals were well-appreciated, it was generally felt that there were always going to be problems arising from trying to capture a wordy stage play in silent film form, with nuances of character and motivation inevitably being lost.  A particular criticism was that the film's intertitles were not only excessive in number, but also written in a slipshod, clumsy and ungrammatical style.

Status
There is no record of the film having been seen after its original cinema release.  The British Film Institute has been unable to locate a print for inclusion in the National Archive, and has included it on the "BFI 75 Most Wanted" list of missing British feature films.

See also
List of lost films

References

External links 
 BFI 75 Most Wanted entry, with extensive notes
 
 Who Is the Man? at SilentEra

1924 romantic drama films
British romantic drama films
British silent feature films
Films directed by Walter Summers
British black-and-white films
British films based on plays
Films based on works by Louis Verneuil
Lost British films
Lost romantic drama films
1924 films
1924 lost films
1920s British films
Silent romantic drama films
1920s English-language films